Jamaica competed at the  Commonwealth Games in Manchester. It was the 13th time that the nation has competed at the Games.
Jamaica sent 44 men and 44 women  and came 13th in the medals table, a drop in placing from 9th in Kuala Kumpur in 1998 but showing a significant increase in the number of medals won.

Medals

Gold
Athletics:
 Lacena Golding-Clarke, Women's 100 Meters Hurdles
 Michael Blackwood, Men's 400 Meters
 Claston Bernard, Men's Decathlon
 Elva Goulbourne, Women's Long Jump

Silver
Athletics:
 Veronica Campbell, Women's 100 Meters
 Vonette Dixon, Women's 100 Meters Hurdles
 Juliet Campbell, Women's 200 Meters
 Debbie-Ann Parris, Women's 400 Meters Hurdles
 Asafa Powell, Chris Williams, Dwight Thomas, Michael Frater, Men's 4x100 Meters Relay
 Astia Walker, Elva Goulbourne, Juliet Campbell, Veronica Campbell, Women's 4x100 Meters Relay

Bronze
Athletics:
 Maurice Wignall, Men's 110 Meters Hurdles
 Alexandra "Sandie" Angela Richards, Women's 400 Meters
 Ian Weakley, Men's 400 Meters Hurdles
 Trecia Smith, Women's Triple Jump

Netball:
 Elaine Davis
 Georgia Gordon
 Kaydia Kentish
 Nadine Ffrench
 Nadine Bryan
 Nichala Kadene Gibson
 Oberon Pitterson
 Sharmalee Watkins
 Sharon Wiles
 Simone Forbes
 Tasha Morgan
 Tiffannie Wolfe Women's Netball

Swimming:
 Janelle Atkinson, Women's 400 Meters Freestyle
 Janelle Atkinson, Women's 800 Meters Freestyle

See also
Jamaica at the 2000 Summer Olympics
Jamaica at the 2003 Pan American Games
Jamaica at the 2004 Summer Olympics

References

2002
2002 in Jamaican sport
Nations at the 2002 Commonwealth Games